The Aotearoa Wave and Tidal Energy Association (AWATEA) is a New Zealand organisation established in 2006 to promote renewable energy from marine sources.  This includes energy from tides, waves and ocean currents.

Organisations involved in New Zealand include Genesis Energy, Meridian Energy and Crest Energy.  Several projects are being developed, including Kaipara Tidal Power Station and another in Cook Strait.

Speaking at the 2007 conference, Jeanette Fitzsimons, then NZ Government spokesperson for Energy Efficiency stated that: "I remain very positive, and excited, at the prospects for marine energy in NZ. It is a perfect fit with our history as a maritime nation; the NZ love of the sea and sea going craft; the goals of the NZ Energy Strategy to get as close to 100% renewable electricity as we can; and to the Prime Minister’s aspirational goal to be carbon neutral and truly sustainable."

See also
Ocean power in New Zealand
Electricity sector in New Zealand
Renewable energy in New Zealand

References

External links
 Aotearoa Wave and Tidal Energy Association
 AWATEA - Aotearoa Wave and Tidal Energy Association | NIWA

Renewable energy in New Zealand
Business organisations based in New Zealand
2006 establishments in New Zealand
Cook Strait